Colin Duriez (born 19 July 1947) is a writer on fantasy, especially that of J. R. R. Tolkien.

Life and works
Duriez was born in Derbyshire and spent his early life in Long Eaton, Derbyshire, in a couple of new council estates near Portsmouth and six years in a mining village in South Wales, before moving to the West Midlands. After school he studied for two years at the University of Istanbul, Turkey, before completing his studies at the University of Ulster in Coleraine, Northern Ireland where he read English and philosophy. After a career in editing and journalism in London, interspersed with some teaching, he migrated to Leicester in 1983 to work with a small publisher, IVP, as a commissioning editor. In 2002 he started his own business, InWriting, devoted to writing, editorial services, and some book acquisition for publishers.

Duriez won the Clyde S. Kilby Award in 1994 for his research on the Inklings, the literary group that included Tolkien and C. S. Lewis. He has published many books on Christian literary figures, and other written works, and he has spoken to literary, academic and professional groups.

Books by Colin Duriez

Literary works

 1990 The C. S. Lewis Handbook (Monarch Publications/Baker Book House)
 1992 Tolkien and Middle-earth Handbook (Monarch Publications/Baker Book House/Angus & Robertson)
 2000 The C.S. Lewis Encyclopedia (Crossway)
 2001 (with David Porter) The Inklings Handbook (Azure/Chalice)
 2001 Tolkien and the Lord of the Rings: A Guide to Middle Earth (Azure/Hidden Spring)
 2006 The Poetic Bible (compiler) (SPCK)
 2007 The Unauthorised Harry Potter Companion (Sutton)
 2007 A Field Guide to Harry Potter
 2008 A Field Guide to Narnia
 2013 The A-Z of C.S. Lewis: An Encyclopedia of His Life, Thought and Writings (Lion Hudson)
 2015 (with Cindy Kiple) Bedeviled: Lewis, Tolkien and the Shadow of Evil (IVP Books)

Biography

 2003 Tolkien and C.S. Lewis: The Gift of Friendship (HiddenSpring)
 2005 The C.S. Lewis Chronicles (Darton Longman & Todd)
 2013 C.S. Lewis, A biography of friendship (Lion Books)
 2015 Francis Schaeffer: An Authentic Life (Crossway)
 2015 The Oxford Inklings: Lewis, Tolkien and their Circle (Lion Books)
 2018 J.R.R. Tolkien: The Making of a Legend (Rydon)
 2020 Dorothy Sayers (Lion Hudson)

History

 2008 AD 33: The Year That Changed the World (History Press)

References

External links 

1947 births
Living people
People from Long Eaton
British writers
Alumni of Ulster University